Brachyleptura vexatrix is a species of beetle in the family Cerambycidae. It was described by Mannerheim in 1853.

References

Lepturinae
Beetles described in 1853